James Henderson (1871–unknown) was a Scottish footballer who played in the Football League for Bury.

References

1871 births
Date of death unknown
Scottish footballers
English Football League players
Association football forwards
Leith Athletic F.C. players
Bury F.C. players